Berhampur is a Vidhan Sabha constituency of Ganjam district.
Area of this constituency includes ward no. 1 to ward no. 24 of Brahmapur Municipal Corporation.

Elected Members

15 elections held during 1951 to 2014. List of members elected from this constituency are:
2014 (133): Ramesh Chandra Chyau Patnaik (BJD)
2009 (133): Ramesh Chandra Chyau Patnaik (BJD)
2004: (75): Ramesh Chandra Chyau Patnaik (BJD)
2000: (75): Ramesh Chandra Chyau Patnaik (BJD)
1995: (75): Ramesh Chandra Chyau Patnaik (Janata Dal)
1990: (75): Binayak Mohapatra (Janata Dal)
1985: (75): Siba Shankar Sahani (Congress)
1980: (75): Krushna Chandra Pattnaik (Congress-I)
1977: (75): Ratna Manjari Debi (Independent)
1974: (75): Binayak Acharya (Congress)
1971: (75): Binayak Acharya (Jana Congress)
1967: (71): Binayak Acharya (Congress)
1961: (17): Sisir Kumar Narendra Deo (Independent)
1957: (13): Dandapani Das (Congress) and Lingaraj Panigrahi (Congress)
1951: (104): Dandapani Das (Independent) and Ramachandra Mishra (Independent)

2019 Election Result

2014 Election Result
In 2014 election, Biju Janata Dal candidate Ramesh Chandra Chyau Patnaik defeated  Indian National Congress candidate Bikram Kumar Panda by a margin of 1,039 votes.

2009 Election Result

Notes

References

Assembly constituencies of Odisha
Politics of Ganjam district
Berhampur